Riolos, is a village and a community in the municipal unit of Larissos, Achaea, Greece. It is located on the northwestern edge of the Movri hills, 4 km north of Mataragka, 3 km southwest of Krinos, 6 km southeast of Lappas and 32 km southwest of Patras. In 2001 Riolos had a population of 801 for the village and 810 for the community, which includes the small village Mazaiika.  The river Larissos flows southwest of the village. During the Greek War of Independence a battle took place in Riolos in which the Greeks, led by Thallis Theodoridis the Elder, were victorious.

Historic population

See also

List of settlements in Achaea

References

Populated places in Achaea